Calista is a southern suburb of Perth, Western Australia, located within the City of Kwinana.

Calista is one of the Kwinana suburbs named after a ship. Calista was one of the first ships to bring settlers to the Swan River Colony. She arrived with 73 passengers on 5 August 1829 under the command of Captain S. Hawkins. Two of the most notable passengers on the ship were Lionel and William Samson.

Calista is home to the Kwinana Adventure Park which was voted the Western Australia’s joint Favourite Playground in 2021.

References

External links

Suburbs of Perth, Western Australia
Suburbs in the City of Kwinana